Matías José Pato (born 4 September 1992) is an Argentine professional footballer who plays as a forward for Central Córdoba.

Professional career
Pato made his professional debut with Central Córdoba in a 1-0 Primera B Nacional win over Villa Dálmine on 13 February 2015.

References

External links
 
 

1992 births
Living people
Argentine footballers
Association football forwards
Central Córdoba de Santiago del Estero footballers
Primera Nacional players